The 492nd Fighter Squadron (492nd FS), nicknamed "the Bolars"  and "the Madhatters", is part of the 48th Fighter Wing at RAF Lakenheath, England, where they operate the McDonnell Douglas F-15E Strike Eagle.

Mission
The 492nd Fighter Squadron is a combat-ready McDonnell Douglas F-15E Strike Eagle squadron capable of executing strategic attack, interdiction, and counter air missions in support of United States Air Forces in Europe, United States European Command, and NATO operations.  It employs the full array of air superiority and surface attack munitions to include the most advanced precision-guided weapons in the USAF inventory.  The squadron is capable of deploying to any theater of operations in the world.

History

World War II
Initially activated as a Southeastern Air District Army Air Corps training squadron – the 55th Bombardment Squadron (Light) on 15 January 1941, and assigned to the 48th Bombardment Group. The unit was equipped with a variety of second-line aircraft, such as the Curtiss A-18 Shrike and Douglas A-20 Havoc, preparing its pilots and maintenance crews for eventual combat. After the Pearl Harbor Attack, the squadron flew antisubmarine patrols from March to April 1942. Resumed aircrew training, many of the group's members went on to serve in squadrons stationed in Europe and the Pacific theaters. The unit was redesignated as the 55th Bombardment Squadron (Dive) on 28 August 1942.

The unit was further redesignated as the 492nd Fighter-Bomber Squadron on 10 August 1943 shortly before relocating to William Northern Army Air Field, Tennessee, ten days later. Eventually coming under the United States Army Air Forces III Fighter Command in 1944, the squadron trained replacement pilots with Republic P-47 Thunderbolts. In January 1944, the unit became an operational fighter squadron with the end of RTU training. The 492nd was deployed to the European Theater of Operations (ETO), and assigned to IX Fighter Command at RAF Ibsley, England, in March 1944.

Almost immediately after their arrival, the squadron began a rigorous training program, flying dive-bombing, glide bombing, night flying, low-level navigation, smoke laying, reconnaissance, and patrol convoy sorties. Over the next two months, the number of sorties steadily increased and the squadron flew its first combat mission on 20 April 1944—an uneventful fighter sweep of the occupied French coast. On 30 May 1944, the "bomber" designation was dropped, becoming the 492nd Fighter Squadron.

The 492nd assisted the Normandy invasion on 6 June 1944 by dropping bombs on bridges and gun positions, attacking rail lines and trains, and providing visual reconnaissance reports. On 18 June 1944, the 492nd moved, along with the 493rd Fighter Squadron, to Deux Jumeaux Airfield, France. From where they supported ground operations of Allied forces moving east across northern France throughout the war: primarily providing support for the United States First Army. The unit was eventually was stationed at Illesheim Airfield, occupied Germany, on Victory in Europe Day.

On 5 July 1945, the squadron arrived in Laon, France. After a few weeks back in France, the 492nd received orders to return to the United States. With many of the members separating at port, those remaining set up the headquarters at Seymour Johnson Field, North Carolina and were programmed for deployment to Okinawa to take part in planned Invasion of Japan. Training discontinued after Atomic bombings of Hiroshima and Nagasaki and the sudden end of the Pacific War.

Two months later on 7 November 1945, the squadron was inactivated as part of the massive postwar draw down.

Cold War
The unit was reactivated on 10 July 1952 as the 492nd Fighter-Bomber Squadron (492nd FBS), a NATO squadron assigned to Chaumont-Semoutiers Air Base, France. Equipped initially with Republic F-84G Thunderjets, the squadron upgraded in 1953 to North American F-86F Sabre aircraft, with the last of the Thunderjets leaving by 1954.

Then in late 1956, the squadron upgraded to the North American F-100D Super Sabre, being redesignated the 492nd Tactical Fighter Squadron (492nd TFS) on 8 July 1958. However the nuclear-weapon capable F-100 caused disagreements with France concerning atomic storage and custody issues within NATO, resulting in a decision to remove Air Force atomic-capable units from French soil. On 15 January 1960, the squadron and its host 48th TFW moved to RAF Lakenheath, UK.

Between 1960 and 1972, the squadron's F-100 fleet maintained its readiness by participating in a number of USAFE and NATO exercises training to react to possible aggression from the Soviet Union. They underwent a series of NATO tactical evaluations. The squadron conducted several deployments to Turkey, Italy, Spain, and across the United Kingdom. The 492nd also frequently deployed to Wheelus Air Base, Libya, for training until 1969 when Muammar Gaddafi, who had recently taken power, asked the United States to leave the country.

On 1 October 1971, the 492nd TFS stood down from its NATO obligations, allowing it to convert to the McDonnell Douglas F-4D Phantom II. The first Phantom arrived on 7 January 1972, with the aircraft being transferred from the 81st Tactical Fighter Wing at RAF Bentwaters. The conversion to the F-4D took several years, due to the arriving Phantoms coming from units that had completed their deployments in Vietnam. With the arrival of the Phantoms, the F-4s adopted a common tail code of "LK". This tail code lasted only a few months as in July and August 1972 the 48th TFW further recoded to "LN".

The Phantom's service with squadron was short as operation "Ready Switch" transferred the F-4D assets to the 474th Tactical Fighter Wing at Nellis AFB, Nevada. The 474th sent their General Dynamics F-111As to the 366th Tactical Fighter Wing at Mountain Home AFB, Idaho, and the 366th sent their F-111Fs to Lakenheath in early 1977. Unlike the previous F-4 transition, the F-111 change took place quickly and without any significant problems. Almost immediately after changing aircraft, the squadron began a series of monthly exercises and deployments that took the Liberty Wing to Italy, Iran, Greece, and Pakistan.

On night of 14/15 April 1986, the 492nd TFS participated in Operation El Dorado Canyon, the air raid on Tripoli, Libya as a response to the West Berlin discotheque bombing, alongside the rest of the 48th TFW. The 492nd deployed with their F-111Fs to Taif Air Base, Saudi Arabia, as part of Operation Desert Shield on 2 September 1990, as a response to Saddam Hussein's Iraqi invasion of Kuwait. From Taif Air Base, the unit launched strikes on Iraq as part of Operation Desert Storm between January and February 1991.

Modern era

Redesignated as the 492nd Fighter Squadron (492nd FS) on 1 October 1991, the Bolars switched aircraft again, exchanging the F-111Fs for the McDonnell Douglas F-15E Strike Eagle in early February 1992. This continued to add to the previous 50 years of flying the air-to-ground mission with one of the most capable multi-role/air-to-ground jets in the current Air Force inventory.

The squadron participated in Operation Odyssey Dawn in Libya in March 2011, along with numerous deployments to Southwest Asia supporting Air Expeditionary units as part of the ongoing Global War on Terrorism as part of Operation Iraqi Freedom (OIF) and Operation Enduring Freedom (OEF).

The Bolars participated in a short deployment to Incirlik Air Base, Turkey in November 2015 in support of Operation Inherent Resolve (OIR). Accompanied by 493d Fighter Squadron, the F-15s were sent to enforce the sovereign air space of Turkey.

The Bolars deployed once again in support of OIR in April 2017 for six months as the 492nd Expeditionary Fighter Squadron (EFS), relieving the 389th EFS. On 8 June, 97-0219 shot down a pro-Syrian Regime Shahed 129 UAV after it had fired upon friendly forces. Another Shahed 129 was shot down on 20 June by 98-0135 after it began advancing on coalition forces. The 492nd EFS were replaced by the Seymour Johnson AFB based 336th Expeditionary Fighter Squadron in October 2017. Over the course of the deployment, the 492nd flew over 2,000 missions, delivered over 4,000 precision munitions across 11,000 combat flying hours and achieved two air-to-air kills against enemy aircraft. Because of the squadron's extreme combat effectiveness and achievement of total air dominance in the AO, they were awarded the Raytheon Trophy, a first for any Strike Eagle squadron and multi-role aircraft.

In May 2019, the 492nd provided dissimilar air combat training for the General Dynamics F-16C Fighting Falcons of the 93rd Fighter Squadron, who had deployed from Homestead Air Reserve Base, Florida, to RAF Lakenheath.

Between July and August 2019, the Bolars deployed to the U.S. with 14 F-15Es, initially to participate in Red Flag 19–3 at Nellis AFB, before spending two weeks at Mountain Home AFB alongside the 366th Fighter Wing for Weapon System Evaluation Program (WSEP) exercises 'Combat Hammer' and 'Combat Archer'.

The Madhatters nickname 
While stationed at Chaumont Air Base, France, the Madhatters were seen wearing berets. Upon being relocated to England the squadron adopted the bowler hat, a traditional English hat with a rounded crown. The tradition of wearing the bowler hat has continued to present day despite the lack of official uniform regulations authorizing such wear. Despite the usual spelling of the "bowler" hat, the squadron uses the flight callsign "Bolars."

The practice of adopting the headgear indicative of the various geographic regions the Bowlers are sent to has been continued. In Turkey, each deployed Madhatter had a blue fez hat.

Lineage
 Constituted as the 55th Bombardment Squadron (Light) on 20 November 1940
 Activated on 15 January 1941
 Redesignated 55th Bombardment Squadron (Dive) on 28 August 1942
 Redesignated 492d Fighter-Bomber Squadron on 10 August 1943
 Redesignated 492d Fighter Squadron, Single Engine on 30 May 1944
 Inactivated on 7 November 1945
 Redesignated 492d Fighter-Bomber Squadron on 25 June 1952
 Activated on 10 July 1952
 Redesignated 492d Tactical Fighter Squadron on 8 July 1958
 Redesignated 492d Fighter Squadron on 1 October 1991

Assignments
 48th Bombardment Group (later 48th Fighter-Bomber Group, 48th Fighter Group), 15 January 1941 – 7 November 1945
 48th Fighter-Bomber Group, 10 July 1952
 48th Fighter-Bomber Wing (later 48th Tactical Fighter Wing, 48 Fighter Wing), 8 December 1957 (attached to 48th Fighter Wing [Provisional] 2 September 1990 – 15 March 1991, 7440th Composite Wing, September–December 1991)
 48th Operations Group, 31 March 1992 – present

Stations

 Hunter Field, Georgia, 15 January 1941
 Will Rogers Field, Oklahoma, 23 May 1941
 Hunter Field, Georgia, 7 February 1942
 Key Field, Mississippi, 28 June 1942
 William Northern Army Air Field, Tennessee, 20 August 1943
 Walterboro Army Air Field, South Carolina, 27 January – 13 March 1944
 RAF Ibsley (AAF-347), England, 29 March 1944
 Deux Jumeaux Airfield (A-4), France, 18 June 1944
 Villacoublay Airfield (A-42), France, 29 August 1944
 Cambrai/Niergnies Airfield (A-74), France, 15 September 1944

 Sint-Truiden Airfield (A-92), Belgium, 30 September 1944
 Kelz Airfield (Y-54), Germany, 26 March 1945
 Kassel-Rothwestern Airfield (R-12), Germany, 18 April 1945
 Illesheim Airfield (R-10), Germany, 25 April 1945
 Laon, France (Ground Echelon), 5 July–August 1945
 Seymour Johnson Field, North Carolina, 9 September – 7 November 1945
 Chaumont-Semoutiers Air Base, France, 10 July 1952
 RAF Lakenheath, England, 11 January 1960 – present (deployed to Ta’if, Saudi Arabia 2 September 1990 – 15 March 1991, Incirlik Air Base, Turkey, September–December 1991)

Aircraft

Curtiss A-18 Shrike (1941)
Douglas A-20 Havoc (1941–1942)
Vultee A-35 Vengeance (1942–1943)
Curtiss P-40 Warhawk (1943)
Bell P-39 Airacobra (1943–1944)
Republic P-47 Thunderbolt (1944–1945)

Republic F-84G Thunderjet (1952–1954)
North American F-86F Sabre (1953–1956)
North American F-100D Super Sabre (1956–1972)
McDonnell Douglas F-4D Phantom II (1972–1977)
General Dynamics F-111F Aardvark (1977–1992)
McDonnell Douglas F-15E Strike Eagle (1992–present)

Operations
 World War II
 Operation El Dorado Canyon
 Operation Desert Shield
 Operation Desert Storm
 Operation Allied Force
 Operation Enduring Freedom
 Operation Provide Comfort
 Operation Northern Watch
 Operation Inherent Resolve

References
 Notes

 Citations

Bibliography

See also

492
Fighter squadrons of the United States Army Air Forces
Military units and formations established in 1940